Miss International 1977, the 17th Miss International pageant was held on July 1, 1977 at the Imperial Garden Theater in Tokyo, Japan. Pilar Medina earned Spain's first Miss International crown.

Results

Placements

Contestants

  - Susan Heier
  - Pamela Joy Cail
  - Eva Prevolnik
  - Yvette Maria Aelbrecht
  - Miriam Coimbra
  - Patrícia Viotti de Andrade
  - Sian Helen Adey-Jones
  - Jacki Mary Dreher
  - Silvia Ebner Cataldo
  - Silvia Alicia Pombo Carrillo
  - Hannia Chavarria Córdoba
  - Christa Yvonne Drube
  - Arja Liisa Lehtinen
  - Catherine Pouchele
  - Dagmar Gabriele Winkler
  - Lia Aga
  - Linda Sandlin
  - Prunella JulIe Nickson
  - Willy Muis
  - Maria Marlene Villela
  - Dorothy Yu Yee-Ha
  - Gudrun Helgadóttir
  - Joan Stephens
  - Indri Hapsari Soeharto
  - Anne Marie McDaid
  - Ronit Makover
  - Livia Jannoni
  - Mieko Kojima
  - Shin Byoung-ok
  - Katia Fakhry
  - Dorothea Chuah Poh Kooi
  - Rose Bugejja
  - Ernestina Sodi Miranda
  - Carolyn Judith Grant
  - Marie Gretchen Griffith
  - Bente Lihaug
  - Marta Hernández
  - Theresa Leu San
  - Pilar Medina
  - Sobodhini Nagesan
  - Lena Jernberg
  - Brigitte Bocquet
  - Umpa Phuhoi
  - Mine Koldas
  - Dinorah González Carpio
  - Laura Jean Bobbit
  - Betty Zulay Paredes
  - Svetlana Milorad Visnjic

Withdrawals
  - Maria Cristina "Pinky" de la Rosa Alberto

Notes

1977
1977 in Tokyo
1977 beauty pageants
Beauty pageants in Japan